Enter is a museum for computer and consumer electronics in the Swiss town of Solothurn. Now a non-profit foundation ("Stiftung ENTER"), it originated as the project of Swiss entrepreneur Felix Kunz. It is the largest private technology collection open to the public in Switzerland. Its current location in Solothurn opened in 2011.

History 

The museum originated in the private collection of the Swiss entrepreneur Felix Kunz who has been collecting computers and electronics since the mid 1960s. In 2010, Kunz established a foundation for the museum jointly with Peter Regenass, a collector of calculators. In 2011, the Enter museum moved into a building right at the train station in Solothurn with a surface area of 1800 square metres. In 2022, the museum will be closed and transferred to the nearby village of Derendingen and re-open there on a larger scale in 2023, using a surface area of over 5000 square meters.

Collection 

The museum displays about 10,000 exhibits from the history of radio, television and computers from the early years to the present.

                                        
Many of the exhibits were developed and produced in the Solothurn region, e.g. by Autophon or Anton Gunzinger. The collection has a focus on history of technology made in Switzerland with products of Studer-Revox Paillard, Bolex, Crypto AG, Gretag. It also shows the main stages of computer history with examples of IBM mainframes, Cray supercomputers, Commodore home computers, personal computers from Apple and IBM. It claims to feature "the largest physical collection of working Apple devices in Europe".

Part of the museum is a collection of 300 mechanical calculators of the Swiss collector Peter Regenass. Furthermore, it holds a large collection on the history of radio and television including a vast number of radio and TV sets, recording devices for audio and video and projectors including the Eidophor projectors used 1958 - 1999.Over time the Enter Museum has integrated other collections such as the Audiorama Montreux, which closed its doors in 2010  or the computer collection of the Swiss collector Robert Weiss  or Peter Beck. Its collection has been named as outstanding by the media. There is hardly a computer of the past 50 years that is not on display there, according to a 2013 Neue Zürcher Zeitung article.

Selected exhibits 
 Switzerland's first radio station that started regular emission in Lausanne as early as 26 February 1923.
 Early home computers such as Mark-8 minicomputer, Commodore PET 2001 or Apple 1
 Mechanical calculators such as The Millionaire calculator and Curta.
 Cryptographic devices of Crypto AG, Gretag and others including the Swiss Nema and the Russian Fialka
 The Smaky-computer of Swiss engineer Jean-Daniel Nicoud and the Lilith Computer by Niklaus Wirth
 The video projector Eidophor used 1958 – 1999.
 The outdoor projector Spitlight used at the 1956 Olympic winter games in Cortina di Ampezzo.

Museum shop for spare parts 

The museum endeavors to keep as many of its artifacts working and has a number of veteran engineers and specialists that support the museum as volunteers. The museum keeps a stock of 1.5 million electronic and mechanical spare parts including 40'000 radio valves that can also be purchased at their nominal price from the museum shop.

References

External links 

 Enter Museum Solothurn
 Vintage Electronic Shop
 Solothurn Tourism Organization: Museum Enter

Computer museums
Museums in Switzerland
Technology museums in Switzerland